Usha Chavan is an Indian actress working mainly in Marathi movies. In 1970 Usha Chavan made her debut in Marathi Film “Songadya” with Lead Actor Dada Kondke. She has also had roles in Telugu movies such as Durdabitta, and in the Hindi film Shirdi Ke Sai Baba. She has appeared in many films with actor Dada Kondke.

Filmography

References

External links  
 

People from Maharashtra
Marathi people
Living people
Year of birth missing (living people)